Doramectin, sold under the brand name Dectomax among others, is a veterinary medication approved by the US Food and Drug Administration (FDA) for the treatment of parasites such as gastrointestinal roundworms, lungworms, eyeworms, grubs, sucking lice, and mange mites in cattle. It is available as a generic medication. It is available as a combination with levamisole under the brand name Valcor.

It is used for the treatment and control of internal parasitosis (gastrointestinal and pulmonary nematodes), ticks and mange (and other ectoparasites). Doramectin is a derivative of ivermectin. Similarly to other drugs of this family, it is produced by fermentation by selected strains of Streptomyces avermitilis. Its spectrum includes: Haemonchus, Ostertagia, Trichostrongylus, Cooperia, and Oesophagostomum species and Dictyocaulus viviparus, Dermatobia hominis, Boophilus microplus, and Psoroptes bovis, among many other internal and external parasites. It is available as an injection and as a topical solution.

Society and culture

Brand names 
Doramectin is marketed in other countries as Doramec L.A. for cattle, sheep, and swine.

Doramectin is available for horses as an oral, flavored, bioadhesive gel under the name Doraquest L.A. Oral Gel. It can be used to control and treat internal parasites as roundworms, lungworms and some external parasites.

References 

Anthelmintics
Veterinary drugs